Heriberto Pastor Serrador was a Cuban-born Argentine actor who lived and worked in Spain beginning in the early 1950s.

Biography
Pastor Serrador was born in Camagüey, Cuba in 1919, the grandson of the actors Esteban Serrador and Josefina Marí. His father was the merchant Heriberto Pastor and his mother was the actress , the sister of Esteban, and Pepita Serrador. He was the first cousin of director Narciso Ibáñez Serrador. His childhood was spent in Argentina, where he began his career as an actor on the radio. He debuted in theater around 1935, and in 1938 he married the Argentine actress , separating a few years later. From that union his first son would be born.

The pressures to which he was subjected by his activities as secretary of the  pushed him to move to Spain, where he married the actress Luisa Sala and took up residence in 1952. That year, he and his wife took part in the play Divorciémonos, and in 1954 he started a small company of his own, premiering the play El sabor del pecado.

Serrador then resumed a prolific interpretive career, in theater, film, and television.

Present on Televisión Española since the early days of the broadcast medium in Spain, Serrador was part of the cast of one of its first series,  (1959–1960).

After Luisa Sala's death, he married María Teresa Alonso in 1987 and they had one son. He died on 16th December 2006.

Awards

 Gold medal from the Ministry of Information and Tourism (1970)
 Gold medal from the Ministry of Culture (1977)

Television appearances

References

External links
 
 

1919 births
2006 deaths
20th-century Argentine male actors
Argentine expatriates in Spain
Argentine male stage actors
Argentine male film actors
Argentine male television actors
Argentine musical theatre actors
People from Camagüey
Cuban emigrants to Argentina